An incomplete list of the tallest structures in Bulgaria. This list contains all types of structures.

See also
List of tallest buildings in Sofia
List of tallest buildings in Bulgaria
List of tallest buildings in Europe
List of tallest buildings in the European Union

External links 
 http://skyscraperpage.com/diagrams/?searchID=37711051

Bulgaria

Tallest structures